Lazar Pavić (born 2 February 1994) is a Serbian football midfielder.

References

External links
 
 Lazar Pavić stats at utakmica.rs

1994 births
Living people
Footballers from Belgrade
Association football midfielders
Serbian footballers
FK Smederevo players
Legionovia Legionowo players
NK Zvijezda Gradačac players
FK Sloga Petrovac na Mlavi players
Serbian expatriate footballers
Serbian expatriate sportspeople in Poland
Expatriate footballers in Poland
Serbian First League players
Serbian SuperLiga players